An inclined building is a building that was intentionally built at an incline. Buildings are built with an incline primarily for aesthetics, offering a unique feature to a city's skyline, as well as framing other buildings and structures between them when built in pairs.

Design
Despite the outward appearance of an inclined building as "leaning-over", they are as structurally sound as any non-inclined building. The mass of the building's upper floors is always equal or less than the mass of the building's lower floors, ensuring the building remains balanced around its centre of mass.

The upward slope of an inclined building is not to be confused with the upward slope of an otherwise non-inclined building, such as the Leadenhall Building in London. It should also not be confused with the top-heavy design of an otherwise non-inclined building, such as Vancouver House in Vancouver.

Tallest inclined buildings
As of October 2019, this list includes all intentionally inclined buildings (completed and architecturally topped out) which reach a height of 30 metres (98 ft) or more, as assessed by their highest architectural feature. This includes spires and architectural details but does not include antenna masts.

Other Examples
 
 A pair of 101m (331ft) tall inclined buildings featuring a 15° tilt can be found in Chongqing, China.
 A pair of inclined buildings connected by a skybridge can be found in Akademgorodok, a town located 30 km south of Novosibirsk, Russia.
 An inclined office building is proposed as part of the new "Brighouse Village" redevelopment located across the street from Richmond Centre in Richmond, British Columbia.

See also 
Inclined tower
List of leaning towers
List of tallest buildings

References

External links 
 Inclined towers as electricity pylons at Hoover Dam